Magnis Ridge is a rock ridge  west of Derrick Peak, forming the divide between Magnis Valley and Metaris Valley in the Britannia Range, Antarctica. It was named in association with Magnis Valley by a University of Waikato geological party, 1978–79, led by Michael Selby.

References

Ridges of Oates Land